Good Ass Job may refer to:

 My Beautiful Dark Twisted Fantasy (2010), a Kanye West album developed under the working title Good Ass Job
 Good Ass Job, a cancelled collaboration album between Kanye West and Chance the Rapper